Julie Ann Gregg (born 1966) is an American ex-racing cyclist and cycle coach.

Early life 
Gregg was born in the Kirkland, Washington area 1966, the daughter of keen cyclist and Seattle cycle store keeper Stan Gregg. She began racing in 1989 aged 23. She went on to win medals at national level and competed internationally winning silver medals in the Tokyo Grand Prix, the Pan American Games in Cuba.

Awards and recognitions 
Gregg was inducted into the City of Kirkland's Plaza of Champions in 1992.

She has continued to compete and has won medals at the Masters World Track Championships.

Gregg turned to coaching and completed the United States Cycling Federation’s Elite Coaching program in Colorado Springs.

Palmarès

1991
2nd Sprint, Pan American Games

2001
1st Team pursuit, US Masters National Track Championships

References

1966 births
Living people
American female cyclists
American track cyclists
Sportspeople from Kirkland, Washington
Pan American Games medalists in cycling
Pan American Games silver medalists for the United States
Cyclists at the 1991 Pan American Games
Medalists at the 1991 Pan American Games
21st-century American women